Önneköp is a locality situated in Hörby Municipality, Skåne County, Sweden with 206 inhabitants in 2010.

References 

Populated places in Hörby Municipality
Populated places in Skåne County